Madakkathanam is a village located in the Ernakulam district of the Indian state of  Kerala.

See also
Main Eastern Highway

References

External links

St. Thomas Forane Church, Mylacombu

Villages in Ernakulam district